Mutitjulu is an Aboriginal Australian community in the Northern Territory of Australia  located at the eastern end of Uluṟu (also known as Ayers Rock). It is named after a knee-shaped water-filled rock hole at the base of Uluṟu, and is located in the Uluṟu-Kata Tjuṯa National Park. Its people are traditional owners and joint managers of the park with Parks Australia. At the 2011 census, Mutitjulu had a population of 296, of which 218 (71.2%) were Aboriginal.

The majority of the Anangu (people) are Pitjantjatjara but there are also associated Yankunytjatjara, Luritja, and Ngaanyatjarra people with the languages spoken being Pitjantjatjara, Luritja, and Yankunytjatjara. Arrernte people also have a traditional relationship with Uluṟu.

Tourism
Mutitjulu community run a number of guided tours for tourists visiting Uluṟu, who show tourists certain sites, and share Tjukurpa the story of Uluṟu, as well as of its inhabitants. These tours are called Anangu Tours, from the Pitjantjatjara word Anangu which means "people".

Access to the community is controlled by Anangu, who do not allow visitors to go to Mutitjulu community without permission. The community reserves the right to forbid visitors from entering their land.

The people of Mutitjulu are also the traditional owners of Uluṟu, and have an art exhibition there where they sell paintings and other artefacts.

Economy
Much of the economy of Mutitjulu comes from tourism at Uluṟu and nearby Yulara, a small proportion of which is funnelled back to the local economy. Despite this, Mutitjulu is not wealthier than most other Indigenous Australian communities.

Art centre

Maruku Arts & Crafts is a large and successful Aboriginal Australian-owned and -operated enterprise, run by Anangu (people of the Western and Central Deserts of Australia) since about 1990. It has a warehouse based in Mutitjulu, a retail gallery at Uluṟu-Kata Tjuṯa National Park Cultural Centre, as well as a market stall in Yulara town square. Its artwork consists mainly of paintings and woodcarvings. With about 900 artists in the collective, it provides an important source of income living in remote communities across central Australia. It seeks to "keep culture strong and alive, for future generations of artists, and [to] make culture accessible in an authentic way to those that seek a more in-depth understanding".

Maruku is one of ten Indigenous-owned and -governed enterprises that go to make up the APY Art Centre Collective, established in 2013.

Mutitjulu Band 
The  Mutitjulu Band is led by Kimberley Taylor and David Honeymoon. They have performed at the Araluen Arts Centre in Alice Springs, at a NAIDOC EVENT in Mutitjulu, at Voyagers resort in Yulara. They subsequently had songs recorded at the  ABC recording studios in Sydney, and have grown in popularity.

Education
The community has a school which services students from Year 1 to Year 7, and a high school, Nyangatjatjara College. The cultural traditions of Mutitjulu dictate that once reaching adolescence, children must be taught only with peers of the same sex. Nyangatjatjara College is a boarding school, and hosts the young men and young women of the community separately in consecutive semesters.

As with housing and health, Anglo-European education standards at Mutitjulu, are far lower than the Australian average.

Language
Languages spoken are Pitjantjatjara, Luritja and Yankunytjatjara. Communication between the languages, however, is not difficult as most residents speak several languages and these Aboriginal languages are closely related, all being mutually intelligibly varieties of the Western Desert Language.

Efforts are made to preserve traditional customs, including traditional languages, but some English is spoken by most residents. The level of English literacy by Mutitjulu residents is higher than in many Indigenous Australian communities primarily due to the regular exposure to tourists at Uluṟu.

Relationship to Uluṟu
Many stories have been told by Indigenous Australians from all around Central Australia about Uluṟu. Some of these stories are recreated in paintings and artwork, and many relate to the dreamtime. Uluṟu is seen as having an explanation for why we are humans, and the stories help to describe much of the surrounding flora and fauna.

Climbing of Uluṟu
The local Indigenous community from 1990 requested that visitors respect the sacred status of Uluṟu by not climbing the rock, with signs posted to this effect in late 1989. In 2017 the Uluṟu-Kata Tjuṯa National Park board decided unanimously to ban the activity, from October 26, 2019.

Ownership of Uluṟu
The Anangu consider themselves caretakers rather than owners of Uluṟu. For many years, Uluṟu was controlled by non-Aboriginal Australians, with motels placed close by. Traditional owners who had been forced out of the national park returned and settled at Mutitjulu, and worked towards restoring their land rights. Tourist facilities have been moved about 24 km north to Yulara, just outside the national park boundary.

Title handback
Title to the Uluṟu-Kata Tjuṯa National Park was returned to the traditional owners on 26 October 1985.

Notes and references

Further reading 
Mutitjulu at WARU
Mutijulu Community Council at ATNS
Mutitjulu community profile at General Practice and Primary Health Care, Northern Territory
Anangu Tours website
Bonzle.com Digital Atlas reference page 
, recording a song at the ABC studios in Sydney, May 2019

Aboriginal communities in the Northern Territory
Australian Aboriginal freehold title
Towns in the Northern Territory